Mayaro is an unincorporated community in Butte County, California. A post office operated at Mayaro from 1930 to 1956.

References

External links
 

Unincorporated communities in California
Unincorporated communities in Butte County, California